Class Mythology is an EP by American alt-country band Ryan Adams and the Cardinals, released on April 16, 2011 on PAX AM. Limited to 2500 copies, the EP was released in celebration of Record Store Day, and consists of unreleased tracks recorded for Cardinology (2008).

The release comprises two coloured seven-inch singles, a small poster of deceased bassist Chris Feinstein, and a sticker.

Track listing
All songs written by David Ryan Adams
"Go Ahead and Rain"
"Invisible Red"
"Your Name Is on Fire"
"Future Sparrow"

Personnel
Ryan Adams & the Cardinals
Ryan Adams – vocals, guitar, collage art
Neal Casal – guitar, vocals, photographs
Chris Feinstein – bass guitar
Jon Graboff – pedal steel guitar, acoustic guitar
Brad Pemberton – drums

Technical personnel
Tom Schick – producer, mixing
Andy West – package design

References

Ryan Adams albums
2011 EPs
Record Store Day releases
PAX AM albums